Senator Fairchild may refer to:

Edward T. Fairchild (judge) (1872–1965), Wisconsin State Senate
Roger Fairchild (born c. 1953), Idaho State Senate
Theodore Tracy Fairchild (1865–1950), Nevada State Senate
William H. Fairchild (1853–1929), Vermont State Senate